Sophie Colquhoun (born 12 September 1989) is an English actress. She is best known for her role as Cynthia in the television programme Plebs (2013–2014).

Early life
Colquhoun was born in Liverpool, England.

In 2005, she studied at Central St. Martins of the University of the Arts London. At the Royal Academy of Dramatic Arts, she studied with The Bill director, Peter Cregeen, and attended the site-specific workshop at Prima del Teatro, along with Charlotte Munksø in Italy.

Career
Colquhoun's film credits include Captain America: The First Avenger, Anti-Social, The Inbetweeners Movie and Freaks of Nature.

From 2013 to 2014, she plays Cynthia in the television programme Plebs.

Her television credits include EastEnders: E20, Holby City, Law & Order: UK, Death in Paradise, Crackanory, The Royals and Cuckoo.

In 2017, she joined the voice cast of Thomas & Friends as the voice of Frankie, in Thomas & Friends: Journey Beyond Sodor.

Filmography

Film

Television

References

External links
 

Living people
1989 births
English film actresses
English television actresses
English voice actresses
Alumni of RADA
21st-century English actresses
Actresses from Liverpool